South Cheshire was a parliamentary constituency in Cheshire, England represented in the House of Commons of the United Kingdom from 1832 to 1868. It was created upon the division of Cheshire in 1832. In 1868, it was abolished with North Cheshire to form parts of East Cheshire, Mid Cheshire, and West Cheshire.

History
South Cheshire, or the Southern Division of Cheshire, was created as a two-member constituency under the Representation of the People Act 1832 (Great Reform Act) as one of 2 divisions, along with North Cheshire, of the Parliamentary County of Cheshire. It comprised the Hundreds of Broxton, Eddisbury, Nantwich, Northwich and Wirral, and the City and County of the City of Chester.

Under the Reform Act 1867, Cheshire was further divided with the creation of Mid Cheshire, to which the Northwich Hundred was transferred. South Cheshire was renamed West Cheshire by the Boundaries Act 1868.

Members of Parliament

Elections

See also
List of former United Kingdom Parliament constituencies
History of parliamentary constituencies and boundaries in Cheshire

References

Parliamentary constituencies in Cheshire (historic)
Constituencies of the Parliament of the United Kingdom established in 1832